The Arrondissement of Dinant is one of the three administrative arrondissements in the Walloon province of Namur, Belgium. It is both an administrative and a judicial arrondissement. However, the Judicial Arrondissement of Dinant also comprises the municipalities of the Arrondissement of Philippeville.

Municipalities

The Administrative Arrondissement of Dinant consists of the following municipalities:

 Anhée
 Beauraing
 Bièvre
 Ciney
 Dinant
 Gedinne
 Hamois
 Hastière

 Havelange
 Houyet
 Onhaye
 Rochefort
 Somme-Leuze
 Vresse-sur-Semois
 Yvoir

References

Arrondissements of Namur (province)